R v Dear [1996] is an English criminal law case, dealing with homicide and causation. The court ruled, slightly extending R v Holland, that even if a victim aggravates his wounds sufficiently to cause otherwise avoidable death, the chain of causation is not broken.

Facts
The defendant's 12-year-old daughter complained that the victim had sexually assaulted her, whereupon the defendant took a Stanley knife and slashed the victim repeatedly. The victim far from healed died two days later, of a sudden blood loss from severe bodily harm wounds. The defendant was charged with murder. The defendant claimed a break in the chain of causation as the victim had committed suicide following the attack, either by deliberately re-opening the wounds which had healed, or by failing to staunch the flow of blood from wounds which had reopened of their own accord.

Judgment
The Court of Appeal held that the trial judge had directed the jury correctly by telling them that the real question was whether the injuries inflicted by the defendant were an operating and significant cause of the death. Rose L.J. said:

‘It would not be helpful to juries if the law required them to decide causation in a case such as the present by embarking on an analysis of whether a victim had treated himself with mere negligence or gross neglect, the latter breaking but the former not breaking the chain of causation between the defendant's unlawful act and the victim's death.’

The victim's death was caused by bleeding from the artery which the defendant had caused and so the jury were entitled to find that but for the defendant's conduct, the victim would not have died; the defendant made an operative and significant contribution to the death despite the presence of other operating factors.

If, however, the wounds had healed, the position might be different; the element of suicide, reckless or intended, might break the chain of causation. The Court of Appeal opined that if victim had committed suicide because of the defendant's attack on him, then the chain of causation would not be broken. On the other hand, if such an act arose because of shame at which he had done to the defendant's daughter then the chain would have been broken; it would no longer be possible to say that the victim would not have committed suicide but for the defendant's attack on him.

See also
Approved and considered by
R v Smith (Thomas Joseph) (1959), EWCA
R v Blaue (1975), EWCA
R v Cheshire (1991), EWCA
R v Wallace (2018), EWCA Crim 690

Notes

External links
Bailii.org, a free online database for English and Irish legal materials.

D
1996 in England
1996 in case law
1996 in British law
Court of Appeal (England and Wales) cases